Mary Darling was a Confederate nurse during the American Civil War. In 1860, Darling moved with her husband from Wisconsin to Missouri. When the war broke out, Darling elaborates in a letter to Mary G. Holland that everyone's first reaction was to flee for their safety. After the initial panic, Darling's husband enlisted with the Missouri Home Guard on July 20, 1860, and Darling followed suit. Darling was hired to the regimental hospital; she was supposed to be paid $12 monthly but never received any compensation for her work. Even when the soldiers were away and nursing work was scarce at the hospital, Darling would bake up to fifty pounds of flour into bread daily. When Darling did travel with the regiment, she would work and live out of a tent, fully integrated into camp life, to serve the soldiers.

In December 1861, Darling's husband fell ill with typhoid fever. He was transported to Mound City Hospital in Illinois until March 1863. Darling did not have contact with her husband during this entire period. When her husband returned to the service, Darling joined the regiment in Memphis to care for him until the winter of 1864. After this, Darling worked solely in camps, and subsequently out of tents and makeshift shelters, until the end of her service, notably serving near the Shiloh battleground. Even after her husband was discharged and Darling's official service ended, however, she continued to cook for the soldiers in the barracks.

References 

Women in the American Civil War
Year of birth missing
Year of death missing
American Civil War nurses
American women nurses